The enzyme acetolactate decarboxylase catalyzes the chemical reaction

(S)-2-hydroxy-2-methyl-3-oxobutanoate  (R)-2-acetoin + CO2

Hence, this enzyme has one substrate, (S)-2-hydroxy-2-methyl-3-oxobutanoate, and two products, (R)-2-acetoin and CO2.

This enzyme belongs to the family of lyases, specifically the carboxy-lyases, which cleave carbon-carbon bonds.  The systematic name of this enzyme class is (S)-2-hydroxy-2-methyl-3-oxobutanoate carboxy-lyase [(R)-2-acetoin-forming]. Other names in common use include alpha-acetolactate decarboxylase, and (S)-2-hydroxy-2-methyl-3-oxobutanoate carboxy-lyase.  This enzyme participates in butanoate metabolism and c5-branched dibasic acid metabolism.

Structural studies

As of late 2007, only one structure has been solved for this class of enzymes, with the PDB accession code .

References

 

EC 4.1.1
Enzymes of known structure